= Seoul Robot & AI Museum =

Museum in Seoul, South Korea

The Seoul Robot AI Science Museum (RAIM; Korean: 서울로봇인공지능과학관) is a museum in Seoul, South Korea dedicated to robotics and artificial intelligence. It opened to the public on October 11, 2024. The building was designed by Turkish architectural firm Melike Altinisik Architects (MAA).
